Wallace W. Andrew (December 25, 1850 – January 18, 1919) was an American businessman and politician.

Biography 
Born in Sheboygan County, Wisconsin, Andrew and his parents moved to Oregon, Wisconsin. Andrew was involved with the grain and livestock businesses. In 1894, Andrew moved with his brothers to Superior, Wisconsin and established the Deluxe Manufacturing Company. Andrew served in the Wisconsin State Assembly in 1901 and 1905 as a Republican.

At the time of his death in 1919, Andrew was serving on the Douglas County Board of Supervisors and was chairman of the county board. Andrew died at his home in Superior, Wisconsin.

Notes

1850 births
1919 deaths
People from Oregon, Wisconsin
People from Sheboygan County, Wisconsin
Politicians from Superior, Wisconsin
Farmers from Wisconsin
Businesspeople from Wisconsin
County supervisors in Wisconsin
Republican Party members of the Wisconsin State Assembly
19th-century American politicians